The Performing Arts WA Awards, or PAWA Awards, are annual awards for the live performing arts in Perth, Western Australia. The Awards are held by Artist Relief Fund WA, and were formerly known as the Equity Guild Awards. The awards include mainstage theatre and independent theatre and, from 2018, dance. A musicals & opera section was introduced in 2021.

Selected awards

Theatre: Best Mainstage Production 
 2022: Beanstalk. Spare Parts Puppet Theatre
 2021: Hecate, Yirra Yaakin Theatre Company in association with Bell Shakespeare and Perth Festival
2020: On Our Beach, Spare Parts Puppet Theatre
 2019: You Know We Belong Together, a Black Swan, Perth Festival and DADAA co-production
 2018: The Eisteddfod, Black Swan State Theatre Company
 2017: Clinton: The Musical, Black Swan State Theatre Company
 2016: The Rabbits, Barking Gecko Theatre & Opera Australia
 2015: King Hit, Yirra Yaakin
 2014: Boy Gets Girl, Black Swan State Theatre Company
 2013: Red, Onward Production
 2011: The Modern International Dead, Deckchair Theatre Company
 2010: The Shape of Things, Black Swan Theatre Company's HotBed Ensemble 
 2009: Taking Liberty, Perth Theatre Company
 2008: The Turning, Perth Theatre Company
 2007: The Goat, or Who is Sylvia?, Perth Theatre Company
 2006: The Arrival, Spare Parts Puppet Theatre
 2005: The Visit, BeActive BSX Theatre
 2004: Hidden Dragons, Barking Gecko Theatre
 2003: Skin Tight, Perth Theatre Company
 2002: Below, Effie Crump Theatre & Perth International Arts Festival
 2001: Aliwa, Yirra Yaakin Theatre Company
 2000: Plain Song, Black Swan State Theatre Company

Dance: Best Production 
2022: Archives of Humanity, Co3 Contemporary Dance
 2021: Hofesh in the Yard, STRUT Dance in association with Hofesh Shechter Company
2020: Alice (in wonderland), West Australian Ballet
 2019: Dust on the Shortbread, Anything Is Valid Dance Theatre

Musical & Opera: Best Production 
2022: Angels & Devils, Freeze Frame Opera
 2021: Così fan tutte, West Australian Opera

References 

Australian theatre awards